Prior to its uniform adoption of proportional representation in 1999, the United Kingdom used first-past-the-post for the European elections in Great Britain. The European Parliament constituencies used under that system were smaller than the later regional constituencies and only had one Member of the European Parliament each.

Created for the 1979 European Parliament elections in 1979, Cumbria was a single-member constituency formed from the grouping of numerous neighbouring British Parliament constituencies.

The constituency saw only one election under the chosen boundaries, with the county of Cumbria and electors in Westminster constituencies as far south as the Fylde coast electing its MEP as one constituency in 1979 only. In subsequent elections, the constituency became the expanded Cumbria and Lancashire North.

Boundaries
Barrow-in-Furness; Carlisle; Fylde North; Lancaster; Morecambe and Lonsdale; Penrith and the Border; Westmorland; Whitehaven; Workington

Members of the European Parliament

Election results

References

External links
 David Boothroyd's United Kingdom Election Results

European Parliament constituencies in England (1979–1999)
Politics of Cumbria
1979 establishments in England
1984 disestablishments in England
Constituencies established in 1979
Constituencies disestablished in 1984